Leandro Nicolás Lozano Fernández (born 19 December 1998) is a Uruguayan professional footballer who plays as a right-back or left-back for Nacional.

Career
A youth academy graduate of Nacional, Lozano captained his club to victory at 2018 U-20 Copa Libertadores.

A free agent after leaving Nacional in 2018, Lozano joined Boston River prior to 2019 Uruguayan Primera División season. He made his professional debut on 10 August 2019 in a 0–0 draw against his former club Nacional.

Personal life
Leandro is the nephew of Brian Lozano, who plays a winger for Peñarol and the Uruguay national team.

Career statistics

Honours
Nacional U20
U-20 Copa Libertadores: 2018

Nacional
Uruguayan Primera División: 2022

References

External links
 

1998 births
Living people
Uruguayan footballers
Footballers from Montevideo
Association football defenders
Uruguayan Primera División players
Boston River players
Club Nacional de Football players